Hope for the Dying also known as HFTD is an American Christian metal band from Jonesboro, Illinois, United States. The band formed in 2006 and released their first album (a self-titled EP) in April 2008, the album was later repackaged and released with Strike First Records on November 25, 2008.

History
In November 2008, Hope for the Dying became the first band with an album released on the relaunched label Strike First Records, an imprint label of Facedown Records. Before its retirement in 2006 Strike First Records had signed bands like War of Ages.

They toured as part of Facedown Fest 2009 in April 2009 and have also toured independently.

The group's second album, Dissimulation, was released in April 2011 by Facedown Records.

The Christian faith has a profound influence in the lyrics and motivation of the band.

In 2013 the band has announced on their Facebook page that they will release a new album called Aletheia on March 19 on Facedown Records.

Legacy was released on March 4, 2016, by Facedown Records.

Discography

Members

Current members
Josh Ditto – lead vocals, keyboards (2006–present)
James Houseman – lead guitar, backup vocals (2006–present)
Jack Daniels – rhythm guitar, backup vocals (2006–present)
Brendan Hengle – drums, bass (studio only) (May 2010 – 2013, 2014–present)

Former members
James Red Cloud – bass (2006–2007, 2008)
Brice Voyles – drums (2006–2009)
Zach Gowen – bass (2008)
Jacob Capps – bass (2008–September 2009)
Jesse Fleming – drums (2009–January 2010)
Ryan Dillon – bass (September 2009 – March 2010)
E.J. Sugars – drums (January–March 2010)
Chris Owens – bass (May 2010–September 2010)

Session musicians
Kaleb Luebchow (May 2013–2014) (deceased 2022)

Timeline

References

External links
Official website
Artist Profile at Strike First Records
Hope For The Dying Interview with Outburn Magazine
Hope For The Dying Interview with HM Magazine

Heavy metal musical groups from Illinois
Musical groups established in 2006
Facedown Records artists